Thomas, Tommy or Tom Thompson may refer to:

Politics
 Thomas Thompson (1754–1828), Hull banker, British MP for Midhurst, Weslyan, father of Thomas Perronet Thompson
 Thomas W. Thompson (1766–1821), U.S. Representative and Senator from New Hampshire
 Thomas Perronet Thompson (1783–1869), British politician and reformer
 Thomas Charles Thompson (1821–1892), British MP for City of Durham, 1874 and 1880–1885
 Thomas Thompson (New Zealand politician) (1832–1919), New Zealand politician
 Thomas Larkin Thompson (1838–1898), U.S. Representative from California, ambassador to Brazil
 Thomas Henry Thompson (1866–1925), Ontario merchant, undertaker and political figure
 Thomas Thompson (Australian politician) (1867–1947), Australian politician
 Thomas Alfred Thompson (1868–1953), Ontario farmer and political figure
 Thomas Josiah Thompson,Sierra Leonean lawyer and politician
 Tommy Thompson (born 1941), U.S. politician and governor of Wisconsin
 Tommy Thompson (Kentucky politician) (born 1948), U.S. politician and state legislator in Kentucky
 Tommy Thompson (Arkansas politician) (fl. 2010–2015), U.S. member of the Arkansas House of Representatives (D-AR)

Sports

Football, soccer, rugby
 Thomas Thompson (footballer) (1879–1939), English footballer for Small Heath
 Tom Thompson (footballer, born 1894) (1894–?), English footballer
 Tom Thompson (Australian soccer), Australian soccer player 
 Tom Thompson (American football), member of the 2009 football team for Austin College, Sherman, Texas
 Tommy Thompson (rugby union) (1886–1916), or Gerald Thompson, South Africa rugby player
 Tommy Thompson (rugby league) (fl. 1920–1930s), rugby league player for England and Warrington
 Tommy Thompson (quarterback) (1916–1989), American pro football quarterback, NFL 1940s
 Tommy Thompson (linebacker) (1927–1990), American football linebacker
 Tommy Thompson (footballer, born 1928) (1928–2015), English footballer, Aston Villa and Preston North End
 Tommy Thompson (footballer, born 1938), English footballer, Blackpool and York City
 Tommy Thompson (punter) (born 1972), American pro football punter
 Tommy Thompson (soccer) (born 1995), American soccer player

Baseball, cricket
 Thomas Thompson (cricketer) (born 1934), English cricketer
 Tommy Thompson (pitcher) (1889–1963), American baseball player
 Tommy Thompson (outfielder) (1910–1971), American baseball player
 Tommy Thompson (baseball, born 1947), American minor league baseball player and manager

Other sports
 Thomas E. Thompson (1885–?), American college basketball coach
 Tommy Thompson (NASCAR), American race car driver in the 1955 Southern 500
 Tommy Thompson (racing driver) (1943–1978), Formula Super Vee racing driver

Other
 Thomas Thompson (Master of Christ's College, Cambridge) (died 1540), Master of Christ's 1508–1517
 Thomas Thompson (herald) (died 1641), Rouge Dragon Pursuivant in the reign of James VI and I
 Thomas Thompson (priest), Anglican priest in Ireland 
 Sir Thomas Thompson, 1st Baronet (1766–1828), Royal Navy admiral
 Thomas Thompson (songwriter) (1773–1816), Tyneside poet
 Thomas Clement Thompson (1780–1857), Irish artist 
 Thomas Thompson (businessman) (1797-1869), American businessman and art collector
 Thomas Napier Thomson (25 February 1798 – 1 February 1869) was a Scottish minister, historian and biographer. 
 Thomas W. Thompson (Medal of Honor), American Medal of Honor recipient 
 Thomas Phillips Thompson (1843–1933), English-born journalist and humorist
 Thomas Thompson (writer) (1880-1951), Lancashire author and broadcaster (1880-1951)
 Thomas Gordon Thompson (1888–1961), American chemist and oceanographer
 Thomas Thompson (American author) (1933–1982), American journalist and author
 Thomas Everett Thompson (1933–1990), British malacologist and embryologist
 Thomas L. Thompson (born 1939), American biblical scholar
 Thomas Martin Thompson (1955–1998), executed for rape and murder
 Thomas J. Thompson (fl. from 1981), American television director
 Tommy Thompson (Royal Navy officer) (1894–1966), World War II British naval officer
 Llewellyn Thompson (1904–1972), known as Tommy, United States Ambassador to the Soviet Union and to Austria
 Tommy Thompson (type designer) (1906–1967), American calligrapher, graphic artist and typeface designer
 Tommy Thompson (parks commissioner) (1913–1985), Toronto's first Commissioner of Parks
 Tommy Thompson, birth name Willoughby Harry Thompson (1919–2018), British colonial administrator
 Tommy Gregory Thompson (born 1952), known for his leading role in the rediscovery of SS Central America

Characters
 Tommy Thompson, fictional character in The Adventures of Smilin' Jack

See also
 Thomson and Thompson
 Thomas Thomson (disambiguation)